Rostopchin or Rostopchina is the name of:

 Fyodor Rostopchin (1763–1826), Russian statesman
 Catherine Rostopchin (1776–1859), Russian writer, wife of Fyodor
 Countess of Ségur (née Countess Sofiya Fyodorovna Rostopchina; 1799-1874), French writer of Russian birth, daughter of Fyodor
 Yevdokiya Rostopchina (1811–1858), Russian poet, daughter-in-law of Fyodor

See also 
 Rostopschin, a bonus in tarock games

fr:Rostoptchine
ru:Ростопчины